Edward Korbly Doe Adjaho,  (born 3 January 1957) is a Ghanaian politician and lawyer who was Speaker of the Parliament of Ghana from 2013 to 2017. He is the first speaker to have been elected from among members of Ghana's parliament. He thus became the fifth Speaker of the Fourth Republic of Ghana. Following his elevation to the position of Speaker, he resigned his position as Member of Parliament for the Avenor-Ave constituency in the Parliament of Ghana.

He was one of the few politicians who retained their seats in parliament throughout the Fourth Republic of Ghana serving for 20 years from 1993 to 2013. He was also a member of the Pan-African Parliament.

Early life and education 
Edward Korbly Doe Adjaho was born on 3 January 1957. He studied at the Accra Academy for his secondary school education  and continued his education at the University of Ghana, where he obtained the Bachelor of Law degree, LL.B. in 1984. He enrolled at the Ghana School of Law, where he trained to become a barrister-at-law and was called to the bar in 1986. He worked at the Attorney-General's department before turning to politics.

Career 
Adjaho is a lawyer by profession. He worked at the Attorney-General's Department. He was also a Member of Parliament from January 1993 to January 2013.

Politics

Member of Parliament 
Adjaho stood on the ticket of the National Democratic Congress in the 1992 parliamentary election and retained his seat in all four subsequent elections. He was a member of parliament of the 1st, 2nd, 3rd, 4th and 5th parliament of the Republic of Ghana. He was the First Deputy Speaker of Parliament from 2009 to 2013.

Speaker of Parliament 
He was elected to the position of Speaker of Parliament in the morning of 7 January 2013, succeeding Joyce Adeline Bamford-Addo.He is the first speaker to have been elected from among members of Ghana's parliament. He thus became the fifth Speaker of the Fourth Republic of Ghana.  By virtue of Article 97 of the 1992 Constitution, Adjaho vacated his seat upon assumption of the office of Speaker of Parliament. He was sworn in by Chief Justice Georgina Theodora Woode at the first sitting of the new Parliament. He was the Speaker of Parliament until his tenure ended on 6 January 2017 after the 6th Parliament was dissolved.

Elections 
Adjaho was elected into the first parliament of the fourth republic of Ghana on 7 January 1993 after he was pronounced winner at the 1992 Ghanaian parliamentary election held on 29 December 1992.

He was elected as the member of parliament for the Avenor constituency in the 2000 Ghanaian general elections. He won the elections. His constituency was a part of the 17 parliamentary seats out of 19 seats won by the National Democratic Congress in that election for the Volta Region.

The National Democratic Congress won a minority total of 92 parliamentary seats out of 200 seats in the 3rd parliament of the 4th republic of Ghana. He was elected with 23,981 votes out of 31,431 total valid votes cast. This was equivalent to 78.3% of the total valid votes cast.

He was elected over Abledu A. Kofi of the United Ghana Movement, Vincent K. Norgbedzi of the Convention People's Party and Nicholas C. Megbele of the New Patriotic Party. These obtained 5,665, 616 and 364 votes respectively out of the total valid votes cast. These were equivalent to 18.5%, 2% and 1.2%  respectively of total valid votes cast.

Personal life 
Adjaho is a Christian. He is married and has four children.

See also
National Democratic Congress
Avenor-Ave constituency

References

Sources
 GhanaDistricts.com

|-

|-

Alumni of the Accra Academy
1957 births
Living people
Ghanaian MPs 1993–1997
Ghanaian MPs 1997–2001
Ghanaian MPs 2001–2005
Ghanaian MPs 2005–2009
Ghanaian MPs 2009–2013
National Democratic Congress (Ghana) politicians
University of Ghana alumni
Speakers of the Parliament of Ghana
Ghana School of Law alumni
Ghanaian Christians
20th-century Ghanaian lawyers
21st-century Ghanaian politicians
Ewe people